Grochów is a district of Warsaw, officially part of the borough of Praga-Południe although not connected at all to the historical "Praga" district. It is one of the most notable residential areas of right-bank Warsaw. There are many blocks of flats, as well as many pre-WWI houses. Grochów is nicknamed "the lungs of Warsaw", owing to its many green spaces. Despite plans made by the former Communist authorities, Grochów had not transformed into a strictly industrial district, even though it had been such in the 19th century.

History
For centuries, Grochów was a small village south-east of Praga. The fields of Grochów and nearby Kamion saw the election of Henryk Walezy (in 1573) and August III Sas (in 1733) as Polish kings, since these fields were chosen as the seat of the Polish election Sejms. Until the late 18th century the village was the property of the bishops of Płock and shared the fate of the nearby Kamion. Since the 16th century, the field of Grochów was about 2.6 square kilometres in size and was one of the biggest undivided fields in all of Masovia. However, the Swedish Invasion of 1656 wreaked destruction, and a prosperous village was completely looted and burnt to the ground; only 9 houses remained. In 1780 Grochów was bought by King Stanisław August Poniatowski who gave it to his nephew, Prince Stanisław Poniatowski. The latter soon built a small manor in the village, the first house there to be constructed of anything besides wood. He soon subdivided the village into eight separate properties, selling each to a different family. This led to a period of prosperity as the village was rebuilt and began to serve as one of the most important centres of grain production and trade for the nearby city of Warsaw.

The Battle of Grochów took place on February 25, 1831, between the Polish forces of Józef Chłopicki and the Russian army of Hans Karl von Diebitsch. Grochów was severely damaged in the fighting, and as late as 1827 had only 105 inhabitants and 22 houses. Then the population grew again rapidly, and by the end of the 1820s several weaving plants and tobacconists' shops were founded. Another battle took place in the vicinity of Grochów during the November Uprising on February 25, 1831, and was named after the nearby woods, the Battle of Olszynka Grochowska. Until the 1850s several other small factories were located in the village, including ones for candles, soap, matches, paints, champagne wine and a brewery, as well as the first steam-powered laundry in Central and Eastern Europe. Such growth led to a rapid increase of the number of inhabitants who settled along the Warsaw-Terespol road (which was renamed Grochowska Street soon afterwards). Finally, in 1916, after the creation of the Kingdom of Poland as a puppet state of Germany, the village of Grochów became a part of Warsaw and a seat of Grochów Area of Warsaw (Komisariat XVII Grochowski).

After Poland regained her independence in 1918, Grochów and all the nearby villages started to grow rapidly. Grochów itself soon lost its rural and industrial character and was gradually converted into a borough built up with blocks of flats. New streets were paved, gas, running water and sewer networks were installed and it soon became one of the most popular places for companies and societies to build cheap houses for their employees and members.

During World War II Grochów escaped destruction, and from the early 1960s, it saw a new period of rapid growth and expansion as new areas were heavily built up with blocks of flats.

Neighbourhoods of Praga-Południe